WDHC-LD is a low-powered television station that is licensed to and serving Dickson, Tennessee. It is affiliated with The Family Channel network, and it is owned by R & F Communications, Inc. of Dickson, Tennessee. It broadcasts on VHF channel 6.

The station's transmitter is located near Cumberland Furnace, Tennessee.

History
The station was founded at the time by W&H Broadcasting Company in 1987 and was licensed to and served Lebanon, Kentucky. The station would not sign on until 1995, and it would carry programming from America One.

Due to its very low power output of 300 watts (0.3 kW), the station's signal originally served all of Marion County, along with northern Taylor and Washington Counties, all of which is in the Louisville, Kentucky media market. On a clear day, the station could be picked up in western Boyle County, which is in the Lexington TV market.

On December 4, 1998, the station would be sold to B&B Management, the sale would be finalized a year later on January 5, 1999. Eleven months later on December 20, 1999, the station would be sold to local businessman Gary White, and the sale would be finalized one month later on January 25, 2000.

W06AY-D was also carried on Time Warner Cable systems in Marion and Washington Counties, as well as in Nelson County, which includes the Bardstown area when the station was in Lebanon. Until its 2021 closure of its Lebanon operations, the station was also a sponsor of the Kentucky Bourbon Festival.

On June 23, 2020, Gary White would sell W06AY to R & F Communications, Inc. of Dickson, Tennessee, led by Lori Reddon Forte (a native of Dickson) and her husband Kenneth Forte, the latter of which also owns local country music radio station WDKN Also with the sale of the station, R & F Communications announced that the station would relocate from Lebanon, Kentucky to Dickson, Tennessee, share studios with radio station WDKN, will begin to broadcast local sports, other local programming and will affiliate with The Family Channel (a network owned by Reach High Media Group) and would change its call sign to WDHC-LD. The station went off the air on March 15, 2021, in preparations to relocate to its new broadcasting location of Dickson, Tennessee, and would officially change its callsign eleven days later on March 26, 2021.

Digital television

Digital channel

References

External links

Television stations in Tennessee
Television channels and stations established in 1987
Low-power television stations in the United States
Dickson County, Tennessee